Eckhart is an animated television series presented on Teletoon in 2000 and 2001. It was created by David Weale and incorporates some of the sounds and culture of Weale's home province of Prince Edward Island in Canada. Eckhart, the title character, was a mouse who was a character in a children's book by David Weale titled The True Meaning of Crumbfest, which was also a Christmas special program on television. Approximately 39 episodes of the program were produced. It also was packaged for sale as a retail DVD product (26 episodes + the Christmas Special). The program was broadcast in 25 countries around the world.

Voice actors and their characters
Eckhart – Jessica Pellerin
Brigid – Martha MacIsaac
Boss Mouse – Don Francks
Tomis – Jack McAndrew
Clara / Madam Thel – Marlane O'Brien
Mavis – Sarah Briand
Shorty – Don Wright
Ned – David Moses
Jasper – Nils Ling
Eleanor – Catherine MacKinnon
Sir Roswald / Narrator – Bill McFadden
Sweeney – Mitchell Underway
Winnie – Lillie O'Brien
Nutsy – Katrina Walsh
Esme – Sherri-Lee Darrach
Reynaldo – Donald Burda
Ringmaster – Don Harron
Clown – Rob MacDonald

Episodes

Season 1 (2000)

Season 2 (2001)

Season 3 (2002)

Global broadcasters
   Australia
 ABC
 ABC Kids
   Canada
 Teletoon
 BBC Kids
   Malaysia
 TV9 (Malaysian TV network) (dubbed in Malay)
   Poland
 TVP1
 TV Puls

References

External links
biographical page about David Weale -author and creator of Eckhart character.
Acorn Press - biographical page about author David Weale
short video clip of Eckhart animated program - at Cellar Door Productions

2000 Canadian television series debuts
2002 Canadian television series endings
Australian Broadcasting Corporation original programming
Canadian children's animated adventure television series
Teletoon original programming
2000s Canadian animated television series
Animated television series about mice and rats
Television shows set in Prince Edward Island